Xindu District is one of 11 urban districts of the prefecture-level city of Chengdu, the capital of Sichuan Province, Southwest China, covering part of the northern suburbs.

Overview
The Xindu District borders the prefecture-level city of Deyang to the north. Xindu District was founded as an administrative district in 2001. It is a historical and cultural region encompassing 13 towns and 255 villages.

The Sichuan Conservatory of Music and the associated Chengdu Academy of Fine Arts have a campus here.

Nicknames
Xindu District is known as the "Tianfu Pearl" and "Fragrant City".

Climate

References

External links

Districts of Chengdu